Galeton is an unincorporated community and U.S. Post Office in Weld County, Colorado, United States.  The Galeton Post Office has the ZIP Code 80622.

A post office called Galeton has been in operation since 1910. The community was named for one Miss Gale, the daughter of a local family of settlers.

Geography
Galeton is located at  (40.521107,-104.584694).

References

Unincorporated communities in Weld County, Colorado
Unincorporated communities in Colorado